The Taiwan Transportation Safety Board (TTSB) is an independent government agency of the Republic of China responsible for major transportation accidents on aviation, railways, waterways, and highways in Taiwan. The council is headquartered in Xindian District, New Taipei. Its headquarters were previously in Songshan District, Taipei.

History

The Aviation Safety Committee, later renamed Aviation Safety Council, was established on 25 May 1998 as an independent agency. It was put under the administration of Executive Yuan in May 2001 until 20 May 2012 after which it became an independent body again. On 1 August 2019, the agency was to be renamed "National Transportation Safety Council". Its portfolio expanded to cover major highway and railway incidents alongside aviation safety, and this was done in a response to a perceived shortcoming in the initial ad hoc investigation of the 2018 Yilan train derailment. The English name ultimately chosen was "Taiwan Transportation Safety Board".

Departmental structure
The agency is grouped into the following structure:

Investigation Lab
Site Survey
Flight Recorders Readout
Performance Analysis
Data Integration & Simulation
Engineering Research & Development

Flight Safety Division
TACARE Systems
Safety Improvement Research Projects
Promotion & Public Affairs
Safety Recommendations Implementation
flight Safety Database

Occurrence Investigation Division
Response to Occurrence Notification
Occurrence Investigation
Safety Recommendations
Investigation Techniques Research & Development
Coordination with International Air Safety Organizations

Legal and Administration Division
Legal Affairs
General Affairs
Account Receivable
Documentation
Transportation
Library

List of leaders
Aviation Safety Committee
 Weng Cheng-yi (25 May 1998 – 19 May 2000)
 Wang Shih-sheng (acting; 20 May 2000 – 23 August 2000)
 Liu Wei-chi (24 August 2000 – 22 May 2001)
Aviation Safety Council, Executive Yuan
 Liu Wei-chi (23 May 2001 – 23 May 2003)
 Kay Yong (24 May 2003 – 30 March 2005)
 Weng Cheng-yi (acting; 1 April 2005 – 11 August 2005) 
  (12 August 2005 – 24 August 2010)
 Chang Yu-hern (25 August 2010 – 19 May 2012)
Aviation Safety Council
 Chang Yu-hern (20 May 2012 – 31 July 2015)
  (19 August 2015 – 22 October 2015)
  (acting; 23 October 2015 – 28 December 2015)
 Hwung Hwung-hweng (29 December 2015 – 27 April 2018)
 Young Hong-tsu (4 July 2018 – 31 July 2019)
Taiwan Transportation Safety Board
 Young Hong-tsu (1 August 2019 – 11 February 2023)

Transportation
ASC headquarters is accessible within walking distance North of Dapinglin Station of the Taipei Metro.

See also 

 Transportation in Taiwan

Notes

Words in native languages

References

External links 
Taiwan Transportation Safety Board website
Taiwan Transportation Safety Board website 
 

1998 establishments in Taiwan
Aviation organizations based in Taiwan
Executive Yuan
Organizations investigating aviation accidents and incidents
Organizations based in New Taipei
Transport safety organizations
Rail accident investigators
Government agencies established in 1998